The Fruit and Flower Mission, located in the West End area of downtown Portland, Oregon, is listed on the National Register of Historic Places.

See also
 National Register of Historic Places listings in Southwest Portland, Oregon

References

Further reading

External links

1928 establishments in Oregon
National Register of Historic Places in Portland, Oregon
Southwest Portland, Oregon
Portland Historic Landmarks